Planorbis carinatus is species of air-breathing freshwater snail, a pulmonate gastropod mollusk in the family Planorbidae, the ramshorn snails.

Description
The width of shell of this species is 9–15 mm. The shell has a noticeable keel at the center of the periphery of the body whorl.

Distribution
Planorbis carinatus is found across Europe from Spain to Scandinavia. The Distribution type is European Wide-temperate range.
 This species has not yet been evaluated for the IUCN red list
 Czech Republic
 Slovakia
 Germany
 Netherlands
 Poland

Ecology 
The habitat of this species is larger water bodies such as the open water of canals, rivers and lakes. 
It is essentially a hard water species and it is only locally found in very soft or acid waters.

References

External links

Planorbis carinatus at Animalbase taxonomy,short description, distribution, biology,status (threats), images

Planorbidae
Gastropods described in 1774
Taxa named by Otto Friedrich Müller